The 1942 Idaho Southern Branch Bengals football team was an American football team that represented the University of Idaho, Southern Branch (later renamed Idaho State University) as an independent during the 1942 college football season. In their second season under head coach John Vesser, the team compiled a 4–2 record and outscored their opponents by a total of 77 to 60.

The Bengals did not field a team during the 1943 college football season, next competing in 1944.

Schedule
Contested during World War II, the team's second and sixth games were played against military service teams.

Notes

References

External links
 1943 Wickiup football section — yearbook summary of the 1942 season

Idaho Southern Branch
Idaho State Bengals football seasons
Idaho Southern Branch Bengals football